Sandwick may refer to:

Canada
 Sandwick, British Columbia, an unincorporated community in the Comox Valley Regional District, British Columbia

England
 Sandwick, Cumbria, a hamlet on the shore of Ullswater lake, Cumbria

Scotland
 Sandwick, Lewis, a village near Stornoway, Isle of Lewis, Outer Hebrides
 Sandwick, Orkney, a parish on the west coast of Mainland, Orkney
 Sandwick, Dunrossness, a settlement on the east coast of Mainland, Shetland
 Sandwick, Unst, in the south east of the island of Unst, Shetland
 Sandwick, Whalsay, a settlement on the island of Whalsay, Shetland
 North Sandwick, a settlement near the Burra Ness Broch archeological site on the island of Yell, Shetland
 West Sandwick, a settlement on the island of Yell, Shetland

United States
 Sandwick Lake, a lake in Minnesota

See also
 Sandvík, northernmost village of the island of Suðuroy, Faroe Islands, Denmark
 Sandvika, the administrative centre of the municipality of Bærum, Norway
 Sandwich (disambiguation)
 Sandwich Islands (disambiguation)
 Sandviken (disambiguation)